Rudolph Francis King (November 2, 1887 – September 10, 1961) was an American politician who served as a member of the Massachusetts House of Representatives from 1937 to 1944 and was House Speaker from 1943 to 1944. Born in Horton Bluff, Nova Scotia, he had previously served as a member of the School Committee, Board of Assessors, and the Board of Health and Cemeteries and was the town moderator and chairman of the board of selectmen in Millis, Massachusetts.

King resigned from the House on August 16, 1944, to become registrar of motor vehicles. In 1946 he was nominated by Governor Maurice J. Tobin to serve as State Commissioner of Public Works, but refused the offer. In 1957, King was forced to retire following a vote by the Massachusetts Governor's Council to remove King from office after he reached the state's mandatory retirement age of 70.

King was an unsuccessful candidate for a seat on the Governor's Council during the 1958 election.

King died on September 10, 1961, in Millis, Massachusetts.

See also
 Massachusetts legislature: 1937–1938, 1939, 1941–1942, 1943–1944

References

1887 births
1961 deaths
People from Millis, Massachusetts
Speakers of the Massachusetts House of Representatives
Republican Party members of the Massachusetts House of Representatives
People from Hants County, Nova Scotia
Canadian emigrants to the United States
20th-century American politicians
Massachusetts Registrars of Motor Vehicles